The 2016 VFL Women's season was the inaugural season of the VFL Women's (VFLW). The season commenced on 3 April and concluded with the Grand Final on 18 September 2016. The competition was contested by ten clubs, most of whom were independent clubs that had been transferred from the now-defunct Victorian Women's Football League.

Clubs
 Darebin Falcons, Diamond Creek, Eastern Devils, Geelong Magpies, Knox
 Melbourne University, Seaford, St Kilda Sharks, VU Western Spurs, Cranbourne

Ladder

Finals series

Semi-finals

Preliminary final

Grand Final

Awards
 Lambert-Pearce Medal (Best and Fairest): Daisy Pearce (Darebin)
 Rohenna Young Medal (Leading Goal kicker): Moana Hope (St Kilda Sharks) – 104 goals
 Debbie Lee Medal (Rising Star): Sarah Hosking (Seaford)
 Lisa Hardeman Medal (Best on ground VFL Women's Grand Final): Darcy Vescio (Darebin)

References